The Dorset Women's cricket team is the women's representative cricket team for the English historic county of Dorset. They play their home games at various grounds across the county, including Chapel Gate, Bournemouth and are captained by Emily Roberts. In 2019, they played in Division Three of the final season of the Women's County Championship, and have since competed in the Women's Twenty20 Cup. They are partnered with the regional side Southern Vipers.

History
Before joining the national structure of women's cricket, Dorset Women played various games as a joint side with Hampshire Women, beginning in 1936. In 2005, they joined the Women's County Championship as part of the County Challenge Cup, winning their group with two wins out of three. However, they failed to gain promotion in the play-off round. Joining the County Championship proper in 2008, Dorset have since always competed in the lowest tier of the competition. Their best finish was 2nd in Division Five South & West in 2011, but in the three following years failed to win a game, and in the five seasons since have only won one game per season. In the Women's Twenty20 Cup, which they joined for its inaugural season in 2009, they have also always played in the bottom tier of competition, achieving their best season in 2018, winning four out of eight games. In 2021, they competed in the South West Group of the Twenty20 Cup, finishing 4th with 2 victories, both on the same day against Wiltshire, with Dorset batter Victoria Pack hitting 79* in the first match and 115* in the second. They finished bottom of their group in the 2022 Women's Twenty20 Cup. They also joined the South Central Counties Cup in 2022, finishing bottom in the inaugural edition.

Players

Current squad
Based on appearances in the 2022 season.

Seasons

Women's County Championship

Women's Twenty20 Cup

See also
 Dorset County Cricket Club
 Southern Vipers

References

Cricket in Dorset
Women's cricket teams in England